Line 2 or 2 Line may refer to:

Public transport

Americas
2 (New York City Subway service), a rapid transit service in the A Division of the New York City Subway
2 Line (Sound Transit), a light rail line in Seattle, Washington
Line 2 Bloor–Danforth, a subway line in Toronto
Line 2 (Rio de Janeiro), a metro line in Brazil
Line 2 (Rio LRT), one of the lines of VLT Carioca
Line 2 (São Paulo Metro), one of the metro lines making up the São Paulo Metro
Mexico City Metro Line 2, a rapid transit line in Mexico City
O-Train Line 2, a light rail line in Ottawa
Orange Line (Montreal Metro), formerly known as Line 2
2 (Los Angeles Railway), former streetcar service

Asia
Kolkata Metro Line 2, a metro line in India
Line 2 (Mumbai Metro), a metro line in India
Line 2 (Pune Metro), a planned line in India
Manila Light Rail Transit System Line 2, a line in Metro Manila, Philippines
Port Klang Line, Line 2 of the KTM Komuter network, Malaysia
Seoul Subway Line 2, a circular line in Seoul, South Korea
Taipei Metro Line 2, Tamsui–Xinyi or Red line, a metro line in Taipei, Taiwan

China
Line 2 (Beijing Subway), a subway line in Beijing
Line 2 (Changchun Rail Transit), a subway line in Changchun, Jilin
Line 2 (Changsha Metro), a metro line in Changsha, Hunan
Line 2 (Changzhou Metro), a metro line in Changzhou, Jiangsu
Line 2 (Chengdu Metro), a metro line in Chengdu, Sichuan
Line 2 (Chengdu Tram), a tram line in Chengdu, Sichuan
Line 2 (Chongqing Rail Transit), a monorail line in Chongqing
Line 2 (Dalian Metro), a metro line in Dalian, Liaoning
Line 2 (Dongguan Rail Transit), a metro line in Dongguan, Guangdong
Line 2 (Foshan Metro), a metro line in Foshan, Guangdong
Line 2 (Fuzhou Metro), a metro line in Fuzhou, Fujian
Line 2 (Guangzhou Metro), a metro line in Guangzhou, Guangdong
Line 2 (Guiyang Metro), a metro line in Guiyang, Guizhou
Line 2 (Hangzhou Metro), a metro line in Hangzhou, Zhejiang
Line 2 (Harbin Metro), a metro line in Harbin, Heilongjiang 
Line 2 (Hefei Metro), a metro line in Hefei, Anhui
Line 2 (Hohhot Metro), a metro line in Hohhot, Inner Mongolia
Line 2 (Jinan Metro), a metro line in Jinan, Shandong
Line 2 (Kunming Metro), a metro line in Kunming, Yunnan
Line 2 (Lanzhou Metro), a metro line currently under construction in Lanzhou, Gansu
Line 2 (Luoyang Subway), a subway line in Luoyang, Henan
Line 2 (Nanchang Metro), a metro line in Nanchang, Jiangxi
Line 2 (Nanjing Metro), a metro line in Nanjing, Jiangsu
Line 2 (Nanning Metro), a metro line in Nanning, Guangxi
Line 2 (Ningbo Rail Transit), a metro line in Ningbo, Zhejiang
Line 2 (Qingdao Metro), a metro line in Qingdao, Shandong
Line 2 (Shanghai Metro), a metro line in Shanghai
Line 2 (Shenyang Metro), a metro line in Shenyang, Liaoning
Line 2 (Shenzhen Metro), a metro line in Shenzhen, Guangdong
Line 2 (Shijiazhuang Metro), a metro line in Shijiazhuang, Hebei
Line 2 (Suzhou Rail Transit), a metro line in Suzhou, Jiangsu
Line 2 (Taiyuan Metro), a metro line in Taiyuan, Shanxi
Line 2 (Tianjin Metro), a metro line in Tianjin
Line 2 (Wuhan Metro), a metro line in Wuhan, Hubei
Line 2 (Wuhu Rail Transit), a monorail line in Wuhu, Anhui
Line 2 (Wuxi Metro), a metro line in Wuxi, Jiangsu
Line 2 (Xiamen Metro), a metro line in Xiamen, Fujian
Line 2 (Xi'an Metro), a metro line in Xi'an, Shaanxi
Line 2 (Xuzhou Metro), a metro line in Xuzhou, Jiangsu 
Line 2 (Zhengzhou Metro), a metro line in Zhengzhou, Henan

Europe
Île-de-France tramway Line 2, part of the modern tram network of the Île-de-France region of France
Line 2 (Athens Metro), a metro line of the Athens Metro, Athens, Greece
Line 2 (Budapest Metro), a subway line of the Budapest Metro, Budapest, Hungary
Line 2 (Bilbao metro), a metro line of the Bilbao metro, Bilbao, Spain
Line 2 (Metrovalencia), a partially completed metro and tram line covering the city of Valencia, Spain
Line 2 (Moscow Metro) or Zamoskvoretskaya line, a metro line in Russia
Line 2 (Nizhny Novgorod Metro), a partly opened line in Russia
Paris Métro Line 2, a metro line of the Paris Métro, Paris, France
Line 2 (Saint Petersburg Metro), a metro line of the Saint Petersburg Metro, Saint Petersburg, Russia
Line 2 (Thessaloniki Metro), a deep-level underground rapid transit line in Greece
U2 (Vienna U-Bahn), a subway line of Vienna U-Bahn, Vienna, Austria

Politics
A "two-line whip",  an application of a Whip in politics (see Chief Whip for details)
"Option 2" (Linje 2) of the 1980 Swedish nuclear power referendum

See also 
Second line (disambiguation)
2 Train (disambiguation)